Ahlem Arfaoui Tartir (born September 14, 1979) is a Tunisian human rights activist.

Early life and education
Arfaoui was born and raised in Testour, Tunisia.

In 1998, she completed a baccalaureate diploma in mathematics. In 2002, She received her bachelor's degree in accounting from the Higher Institute of Management, Tunis. In 2006, she obtained a master of Advanced Studies degree in Internal Auditing from the Higher Institute of Management, Tunis. In 2011, She also completed a diploma in continuing education from the National School of Administration while possessing the rank of adviser administrator.

In 2016, she completed her masters in Public Administration from the University of Kansas. In 2017, she did her MBA from Provident University. In 2018, she became a Certified specialist in local government from the United Nations Institute Of training and Research. In 2019, she did her Ph.D. in Political Science from the University of Kansas and received an honorary Doctorate in Community Development from Los Angeles Development Church & Institute. In 2020, she received an honorary Ph.D. from Royal American University, and a certification in Crisis Management from WHO.

Career
Arfaoui has worked as a mayor of the Municipality of Beja, Tunisia, government delegate, and administrator advisor for government agencies. She served as second-degree Secretary General of the Municipality from 2012 to 2014. Since, 2014, she has worked in local government-related fields. From 2014 to 2017, she has been a delegate of North Beja, Tunisia. Arfaoui is an international consultant in local governance and democracy in the United Nations. She is also an executive member of the International Federation of Aging.

She is the president of the International Organization of Local Government, which is an organization that aims to strengthen local government across the world to promote democracy. She is also an Executive member of the UNA-USA and an honorary member of ILA.

With the help of her organization, she works for sustainable development, decentralization, and youth and women empowerment in different municipalities across the globe. Arfaoui holds the position of administrative and financial advisor at the League of Arab States. She is the vice president of the International Federation of African Women and an Ambassador of Peace in the US and Tunisia. Since 2011, she has been serving as a trainer and coach at the Center for Training and Supporting Decentralization.

Arfaoui has participated in various international events such as the Regional Forum on Sustainable Development for the UNECE Region 2022. She is the president of the International Human Rights Observer (IHRO), USA. She participated in the USBCCI Business Expo 2022 held in the USA. She is a member of the Women’s Economic Forum and served as a speaker at the Women's Economic Forum in Tunisia in 2019. She participated as a member in the 21st Session of the Committee of Experts on Public Administration 2022 at the United Nations Headquarters. She is also a member of The Global Network Of Civil Society Organisations For Disaster Reduction.

Recognition
Arfaoui has received a Certificate of Appreciation from GIZ, Germany for her services. In 2018, she was presented with a Certificate of Honor from the Tunisian President on National Women's Day. She received a Certificate of Appreciation from the United Nations on International Women's Day 2018. The certificate was presented for recognizing her services in improving the role of women in local governance.

Arfaoui received the Excellence in Service Award from the International Human Rights Commission. In 2021, she received the Lifetime Achievement Award from US President Joe Biden.

References

Living people
1979 births
Tunisian human rights activists
People from Béja Governorate